Pseudomuscari chalusicum, the Chalus grape hyacinth, is a species of flowering plant in the squill subfamily Scilloideae of the asparagus  family Asparagaceae, native to Iran. Chalus is a county in northern Iran. The flower colour is pale blue at the tip, shading downwards to a darker blue. Unlike some other Muscari species, it does not spread rapidly.

It is still known under its synonym Muscari pseudomuscari. In cultivation in the United Kingdom it has gained the Royal Horticultural Society’s Award of Garden Merit.

References

Flora of Iran
Scilloideae